Stelechocarpus burahol, known as the burahol (loanword from Sundanese), kepel, kepel fruit, keppel fruit, or kepel apple, is an annonaceous plant from the humid evergreen forests of Southeast Asia, known for producing an edible fruit. The fruit is grown only in central Java, Indonesia.

The plant is an evergreen, with stiff, elliptical, glossy leaves.

The fruits of S. burahol grow on the lower part of the trunk, on the larger branches. They have a spicy flavor akin to that of the mango. The new growth is bright pink or burgundy, known for producing an edible fruit.

One can propagate S. burahol from the seeds of ripe fruit.

The fruit of this species has traditionally been known in Java to have value as an oral deodorant. Out of the pulp, seed and peel, the peel has the best adsorbent ability. A 2012 study showed that it reduced the odor of feces by activating the probiotic bacteria Bifidobacterium bifidum.  Stelechocarpus burahol is also an antihyperuricemic, and has traditionally been used to treat gout.

This fruit is an identity flora of Daerah Istimewa Jogjakarta. Stelechocarpus burahol was loved by Javanese princesses because it was a symbol of unity and mental and physical integrity. Because it functioned as a deodorant, many common people did not have this tree planted because they believed they would get cursed. That made this tree rare.

This fruit was also believed to be used by Javanese princesses as contraception. The fruit is believed to have the function of preventing kidney inflammation. The wood can be made into house tools, the leaves used to lower cholesterol.

This rare fruit can be found at Keraton Jogjakarta area, Taman Mini Indonesia Indah, Taman Kiai Langgeng Magelang and Kebun Raya Bogor.

References

Annonaceae
Flora of Malesia
Fruits originating in Asia